The 2009 Championship League was a professional non-ranking snooker tournament that was played from 5 January to 26 March 2009 at the Crondon Park Golf Club in Stock, England.

Judd Trump won in the final 3–2 against Mark Selby, and earned a place in the 2009 Premier League Snooker.

Prize fund
The breakdown of prize money for this year is shown below:

Group 1–7
Winner: £3,000
Runner-up: £2,000
Semi-final: £1,000
Frame-win in league stage: £100
Frame-win in play-offs: £300

Winners group
Winner: £10,000
Runner-up: £5,000
Semi-final: £3,000
Frame-win in league stage: £200
Frame-win in play-offs: £300

Tournament total: £175,600

Group one
Group one matches were played on 5 and 6 January 2009. Mark Selby was the first player to qualify for the winners group.

Matches

Joe Perry 2–2 Ryan Day
Mark Selby 2–2 Ali Carter
Shaun Murphy 2–2 Stephen Hendry
Ding Junhui 3–1 Joe Perry
Ryan Day 1–3 Mark Selby
Ali Carter 2–2 Shaun Murphy
Stephen Hendry 1–3 Ding Junhui
Joe Perry 1–3 Mark Selby
Ryan Day 2–2 Ali Carter
Shaun Murphy 1–3 Ding Junhui
Mark Selby 2–2 Ding Junhui
Stephen Hendry 2–2 Ali Carter
Joe Perry 2–2 Stephen Hendry
Ryan Day 1–3 Shaun Murphy
Ali Carter 1–3 Ding Junhui
Mark Selby 1–3 Stephen Hendry
Joe Perry 4–0 Shaun Murphy
Ryan Day 1–3 Ding Junhui
Ryan Day 3–1 Stephen Hendry
Shaun Murphy 2–2 Mark Selby
Joe Perry 2–2 Ali Carter

Table

Play-offs

Group two
Group two matches were played on 7 and 8 January 2009. Mark Allen was the second player to qualify for the winners group.

Matches

Ali Carter 1–3 Ding Junhui
Joe Perry 3–1 Stephen Hendry
Mark Allen 3–1 Peter Ebdon
Mark Williams 1–3 Ali Carter
Ding Junhui 3–1 Joe Perry
Stephen Hendry 3–1 Mark Allen
Peter Ebdon 1–3 Mark Williams
Ali Carter 3–1 Joe Perry
Ding Junhui 4–0 Stephen Hendry
Mark Allen 2–2 Mark Williams
Joe Perry 2–2 Mark Williams
Peter Ebdon 1–3 Stephen Hendry
Ali Carter 3–1 Peter Ebdon
Ding Junhui 2–2 Mark Allen
Stephen Hendry 2–2 Mark Williams
Joe Perry 3–1 Peter Ebdon
Ali Carter 1–3 Mark Allen
Ding Junhui 2–2 Mark Williams
Joe Perry 2–2 Mark Allen
Ding Junhui 3–1 Peter Ebdon
Ali Carter 3–1 Stephen Hendry

Table

Play-offs

Group three
Group three matches were played on 9 and 10 February 2009. Joe Perry was the third player to qualify for the winners group.

Matches

 Joe Perry 1–3 Ding Junhui
 Ali Carter 2–2 Mark Williams
 John Higgins 1–3 Neil Robertson
 Barry Hawkins 2–2 Joe Perry
 Ding Junhui 2–2 Ali Carter
 Mark Williams 2–2 John Higgins
 Neil Robertson 2–2 Barry Hawkins
 Joe Perry 2–2 Ali Carter
 Ding Junhui 1–3 Mark Williams
 John Higgins 1–3 Barry Hawkins
 Ali Carter 3–1 Barry Hawkins
 Neil Robertson 2–2 Mark Williams
 Joe Perry 3–1 Neil Robertson
 Ding Junhui 2–2 John Higgins
 Mark Williams 3–1 Barry Hawkins
 Ali Carter 1–3 Neil Robertson
 John Higgins 2–2 Joe Perry
 Ding Junhui 1–3 Barry Hawkins
 Ali Carter 1–3 John Higgins
 Neil Robertson 4–0 Ding Junhui
 Joe Perry 2–2 Mark Williams

Table

Play-offs

Group four
Group four matches were played on 11 and 12 February 2009. Stuart Bingham was the fourth  player to qualify for the winners group.

Matches

 Mark Williams 2–2 Neil Robertson
 Barry Hawkins 1–3 John Higgins
 Dave Harold 0–4 Stuart Bingham
 Jamie Cope 3–1 Mark Williams
 John Higgins 4–0 Dave Harold
 Neil Robertson 0–4 Barry Hawkins
 Jamie Cope 3–1 Stuart Bingham
 Barry Hawkins 3–1 Mark Williams
 Neil Robertson 0–4 John Higgins
 Dave Harold 2– 2 Jamie Cope
 Barry Hawkins 0–4 Jamie Cope
 John Higgins 2–2 Stuart Bingham
 Mark Williams 3–1 Stuart Bingham
 Neil Robertson 4–0 Dave Harold
 John Higgins 2–2 Jamie Cope
 Barry Hawkins 2–2 Stuart Bingham
 Mark Williams 3–1 Dave Harold
 Neil Robertson 2–2 Jamie Cope
 Barry Hawkins 2–2 Dave Harold
 Neil Robertson 1–3 Stuart Bingham
 Mark Williams 2–2 John Higgins

Table

Play-offs

Group five
Group five matches were played on 2 and 3 March 2009. Mark King was the fifth player to qualify for the winners group.

Matches

 John Higgins 1–3 Jamie Cope
 Barry Hawkins 1–3 Mark Williams
 Mark King 2–2 Matthew Stevens
 Ken Doherty 1–3 John Higgins
 Jamie Cope 2–2 Barry Hawkins
 Mark Williams 1–3 Mark King
 Matthew Stevens 1–3 Ken Doherty
 John Higgins 1–3 Barry Hawkins
 Jamie Cope 3–1 Mark Williams
 Mark King 2–2 Ken Doherty
 Barry Hawkins 0–4 Ken Doherty
 Matthews Stevens 3–1 Mark Williams
 John Higgins 2–2 Matthew Stevens
 Jamie Cope 2–2 Mark King
 Mark Williams 2–2 Ken Doherty
 Barry Hawkins 3–1 Matthew Stevens
 John Higgins 3–1 Mark King
 Jamie Cope 2–2 Ken Doherty
 Barry Hawkins 1–3 Mark King
 Jamie Cope 2–2 Matthew Stevens
 John Higgins 3–1 Mark Williams

Table

Play-offs

Group six
Group six matches were played on 4 and 5 March 2009. John Higgins was the sixth player to qualify for the winners group.

Matches

 Ken Doherty 1–3 Jamie Cope
 John Higgins 3–1 Joe Swail
 Matthew Stevens 2–2 Graeme Dott
 Steve Davis 3–1 Ken Doherty
 Jamie Cope 1–3 John Higgins
 Joe Swail 3–1 Matthew Stevens
 Graeme Dott 1–3 Steve Davis
 Ken Doherty 2–2 John Higgins
 Jamie Cope 3–1 Joe Swail
 Matthew Stevens 2–2 Steve Davis
 John Higgins 2–2 Steve Davis
 Graeme Dott 2–2 Joe Swail
 Ken Doherty 3–1 Graeme Dott
 Jamie Cope 0–4 Matthew Stevens
 Joe Swail 1–3 Steve Davis
 John Higgins 3–1 Graeme Dott
 Ken Doherty 2–2 Matthew Stevens
 Jamie Cope 1–3 Steve Davis
 John Higgins 1–3 Matthew Stevens
 Jamie Cope 0–4 Graeme Dott
 Ken Doherty 1–3 Joe Swail

Table

Play-offs

Group seven
Group seven matches were played on 23 and 24 March 2009. Judd Trump was the last player to qualify for the winners group.

Matches

 Matthew Stevens 1–3 Steve Davis
 Joe Swail 2–2 Graeme Dott
 Ricky Walden 3–1 Liang Wenbo
 Judd Trump 0–4 Steve Davis
 Matthew Stevens 3–1 Joe Swail
 Graeme Dott 1–3 Ricky Walden
 Liang Wenbo 1–3 Judd Trump
 Steve Davis 1–3 Joe Swail
 Matthew Stevens 0–4 Graeme Dott
 Ricky Walden 1–3 Judd Trump
 Joe Swail 1–3 Judd Trump
 Liang Wenbo 2–2 Graeme Dott
 Steve Davis 4–0 Liang Wenbo
 Matthew Stevens 0–4 Ricky Walden
 Graeme Dott 1–3 Judd Trump
 Joe Swail 2–2 Liang Wenbo
 Steve Davis 2–2 Ricky Walden
 Matthew Stevens 1–3 Judd Trump
 Joe Swail 1–3 Ricky Walden
 Matthew Stevens 2–2 Liang Wenbo
 Steve Davis 2–2 Graeme Dott

Table

 Play-offs 

Winners group
The matches of the winners group were played on 25 and 26 March 2009. Judd Trump has qualified for the 2009 Premier League.

Matches

 Mark Selby 3–1 Mark Allen
 Joe Perry 2–2 Stuart Bingham Mark King 1–3 John Higgins
 Judd Trump 1–3 Mark Selby
 Mark Allen 1–3 Joe Perry
 Stuart Bingham 3–1 Mark King
 John Higgins 2–2 Judd Trump Mark Selby 1–3 Joe Perry
 Mark Allen 2–2 Stuart Bingham Mark King 1–3 Judd Trump
 Joe Perry 1–3 Judd Trump
 John Higgins 1–3 Stuart Bingham
 Mark Selby 3–1 John Higgins
 Mark Allen 3–1 Mark King
 Stuart Bingham 2–2 Judd Trump Joe Perry 2–2 John Higgins Mark Allen 2–2 Judd Trump Mark Selby 4–0 Mark King
 Joe Perry 2–2 Mark King''
 Mark Allen 0–4 John Higgins
 Mark Selby 3–1 Stuart Bingham

Table

Play-offs

Century breaks
Total: 77

145, 133, 132, 122, 121, 113  Mark Selby
144, 125, 106  Barry Hawkins
137, 125, 125, 122, 108, 104  Jamie Cope
136, 128, 125, 109, 108, 105, 102, 101  Joe Perry
134, 127  Stuart Bingham
134, 115, 101  Ricky Walden
133, 131, 130, 125, 123, 123, 113,113, 109, 109, 106, 104, 103, 103  John Higgins
133, 118, 113, 111, 104  Judd Trump
133  Liang Wenbo
132, 131, 125, 123, 122, 120, 117, 115, 105, 101  Ding Junhui
131, 126, 114, 113  Matthew Stevens
129  Dave Harold
127, 115, 109  Ken Doherty
127  Mark Allen
121, 113, 101  Ali Carter
118, 116  Mark Williams
114  Graeme Dott
106  Stephen Hendry
106  Steve Davis
105, 101  Neil Robertson

Winnings 

Green: Won the group. All prize money in GBP.

Source=Championship League Snooker by Matchroom Sport

References

External links
 

Championship League
Championship League
Championship League

nl:Premier League Snooker 2009#Championship League